The Goddard High Resolution Spectrograph (GHRS or HRS) was an ultraviolet spectrograph installed on the Hubble Space Telescope during its original construction, and it was launched into space as part of that space telescope aboard the Space Shuttle Discovery on April 24, 1990 (STS-31). The instrument is named after 20th century rocket pioneer Robert H. Goddard.

One of the results was the discovery of tenuous atmosphere for Jupiter's moon Europa in 1995. The gas was determined to be mostly of molecular oxygen (O2). The surface pressure of Europa's atmosphere is 0.1 μPa, or 10−12 times that of the Earth.

An example GHRS use was to observe the local interstellar medium in the direction towards Capella.

The Goddard High Resolution Spectrograph was removed from the Hubble Space Telescope during the February, 1997, Space Shuttle Discovery mission STS-82 (also called SM-2 for Servicing Mission 2). It, and the Faint Object Spectrograph, were replaced by two new instruments installed during the mission, the Near Infrared Camera and Multi-Object Spectrometer (NICMOS) and the Space Telescope Imaging Spectrograph.

Goddard High Resolution Spectrograph HRS facts
Instrument type: Ultraviolet spectrograph
Wavelength range: 1150 to 3200 Å (105 to 320 nm)
Resolving Power 
 Low - 2,000 
 Medium - 25,000 
 High - 80,000 

A technical description of the construction and operation of the GHRS can be found in the GHRS instrument handbook.

References

External links
The Goddard High Resolution Spectrograph
ESA/Hubble

Hubble Space Telescope instruments
Spectrographs
Space hardware returned to Earth intact